Anthony Alfred Henley (7 November 1846 – 14 December 1916) was an English cricketer and medical doctor.

The son of Cornish Henley, he was born at Sherborne in November 1846. He was educated there at Sherborne School, where he played for and captained the school cricket team. He played first-class cricket for Hampshire in 1866, making a single appearance against Surrey at The Oval. Playing as a wicket-keeper in the match, he batted twice and was dismissed for 7 runs by George Griffith in Hampshire's first innings, while in their second innings he was dismissed by Thomas Humphrey for 9 runs. Henley was by profession a doctor and was resident at Woodbridge in Suffolk until his death there in December 1916. His son, Francis, was also a first-class cricketer, as was his brother Robert.

References

External links

1846 births
1916 deaths
People from Sherborne
Cricketers from Dorset
People educated at Sherborne School
English cricketers
Hampshire cricketers
19th-century English medical doctors
20th-century English medical doctors